JFK: The Lost Bullet is a documentary by National Geographic first shown on the Nation Geographic in late 2011. It tries to answer what happened to the first bullet fired at John F Kennedy. It re-evaluates the famous Zapruder film that shows the murder of JFK and states that Zapruder stopped filming and missed the first shot fired which changes the timeline of the bullets fired making it possible that the first bullet hit a traffic signal. The documentary also features other home movies taken on the day.

See also
Max Holland
Single-bullet theory
John F. Kennedy assassination conspiracy theories

References

http://natgeotv.com.au/tv/jfk-the-lost-bullet/
http://www.abc.net.au/4corners/stories/2013/11/11/3885332.htm
http://www.nytimes.com/2011/11/19/arts/television/jfk-the-lost-bullet-on-national-geographic-review.html?_r=0

External links
 

2011 television films
2011 films
Documentary films about the assassination of John F. Kennedy
National Geographic (American TV channel) original programming
2010s American films